Subject to Change is an album by Henry Threadgill released on the About Time label in 1985.  The album features six of Threadgill's compositions performed by Threadgill with Ray Anderson, Rasul Siddik, Fred Hopkins, Diedre Murray, Pheeroan akLaff and John Betsch with Amina Claudine Myers contributing vocals to one track.

The Allmusic review by Brian Olewnick states, "Subject to Change continued to display the leader's extraordinary compositional gifts in a series of pieces ranging from the episodic to the melancholy to the purely grooving... meaty, imaginative, solidly and even inspiringly played, and rich in evocations of past musics while looking straight into the future".

Track listing
All compositions by Henry Threadgill
 "Just Trinity the Man" - 7:01 
 "Homeostasis" (words by Emilio Cruz) - 4:32 
 "Higher Places - 7:34 
 "Subject to Change" - 10:53 
 "This" - 5:29 
 "A Piece of Software" (lyrics by Cassandra Wilson) - 5:29 
Recorded at Right Track Studios, New York City on December 7–9, 1984

Personnel
Henry Threadgill - alto saxophone, tenor saxophone, clarinet, flute
Ray Anderson - trombone
Rasul Siddik - cornet
Diedre Murray - cello
Fred Hopkins - bass
John Betsch - percussion
Pheeroan akLaff - percussion, recitation (track 2)
Amina Claudine Myers - vocal (track 6)

References

1985 albums
Henry Threadgill albums